Krafft is a prominent lunar impact crater located near the western edge of the Oceanus Procellarum. To the north is the lava-flooded walled plain Eddington. Almost due south is the crater Cardanus, and the two are connected by a 60-kilometer-long chain of craters known as the Catena Krafft.

Krafft has a sharp, circular rim with a rampart on the exterior, and no central peak. There are several associated craters near the southern rim that are notable for their size in relation to the dimensions of Krafft.

Satellite craters
By convention these features are identified on lunar maps by placing the letter on the side of the crater midpoint that is closest to Krafft.

References

 
 
 
 
 
 
 
 
 
 
 
 

Impact craters on the Moon